The 2011 Grand Prix motorcycle racing season was the 63rd F.I.M. Road Racing World Championship season. The 2011 season was also the final season for 800cc engines in MotoGP, and also for 125cc machinery, as both MotoGP switched back to 1000cc engines and a new four-stroke Moto3 class was also introduced in 2012.
Casey Stoner was crowned as MotoGP World Champion for the second time, following his ninth victory of the season at the Australian Grand Prix. As of 2022, this was the last time the premier class was won by a non-European rider, and also the only season in the 2010s decade that the premier class was won by a rider other than Marc Márquez or Jorge Lorenzo.
The Moto2 title was decided before the final race of the season at the Valencian Grand Prix. Stefan Bradl became Germany's first motorcycle World Champion since Dirk Raudies won the  125cc World Championship title after Marc Márquez, the only rider that could deny Bradl of the championship, was ruled out of the race due to injuries suffered during free practice at the Malaysian Grand Prix.
The final 125cc world championship title went to Spain's Nicolás Terol, after he finished second in the final race of the season in Valencia, and his only title rival Johann Zarco crashed out during the early stages of the race.
The season was marred by the death of Marco Simoncelli at the Malaysian Grand Prix.

2011 Grand Prix season calendar
The following Grands Prix were scheduled to take place in 2011:
An 18-race provisional calendar was announced on 30 September 2010.
The Japanese Grand Prix, originally scheduled for 24 April, was moved to 2 October due to the effects of the Tōhoku earthquake and the Fukushima I nuclear accidents.

 ‡ = Night race
 † = MotoGP class only
 †† = Saturday Race

Calendar changes
 The Portuguese Grand Prix was moved forward, from 31 October to 1 May.
 The Italian Grand Prix was moved back, from 6 June to 3 July.
 The Catalan Grand Prix was moved forward, from 4 July to 5 June.
 Only the MotoGP class raced during the United States Grand Prix because of a Californian law on air pollution, preventing the 125cc and Moto2 classes from racing.

2011 Grand Prix season results

 ‡ = Night race
 † = MotoGP class only
 †† = Saturday Race

Footnotes

Participants

MotoGP participants
 A 17-rider provisional entry list was released on 24 January 2011. Seven-time MotoGP champion Valentino Rossi rode for the factory Ducati team, whilst Casey Stoner, winner of the MotoGP championship in 2007, moved to the factory Honda team. Jorge Lorenzo, Dani Pedrosa & Andrea Dovizioso retained their seats at the factory Yamaha and Honda teams respectively. Former World Superbike champion Ben Spies moved from the Tech 3 Yamaha team to the factory Yamaha team. Moto2 champion in 2010, Toni Elías returned to the MotoGP class with LCR Team, while Karel Abraham also moved up from Moto2, as he signed a contract to ride a privateer Ducati in 2011.

All entries used Bridgestone tyres.

1 Being his final MotoGP race, Capirossi switched numbers for Valencia as a memorial to his fallen countryman Simoncelli, killed at Sepang, by racing with the #58 that Simoncelli used, instead of his normal #65. He was still shown as #65 in official timing documentation.

Rider changes
 Hiroshi Aoyama moved from Interwetten Honda MotoGP Team to San Carlo Honda Gresini, still riding a Honda.
 Ben Spies was promoted by Yamaha from Monster Yamaha Tech 3 Team to the factory team.
 Randy de Puniet joined Pramac Racing Team, coming from LCR Honda MotoGP.
 Karel Abraham moved up from Moto2 with his family's team, riding a Ducati.
 Moto2 reigning champion Toni Elías returned to the MotoGP category, joining team LCR Honda MotoGP.
 Casey Stoner left Ducati Corse to join Repsol Honda.
 Cal Crutchlow debuted in MotoGP with Monster Yamaha Tech 3 Team, moving across from the Superbike World Championship.
 After seven seasons, Valentino Rossi left Yamaha Factory Racing to join Ducati Corse.
 Loris Capirossi returned to Ducati, riding for Pramac Racing Team moving across from Rizla Suzuki.

Moto2 participants
On 31 October 2010, a list of 22 teams was accepted by the Fédération Internationale de Motocyclisme, Dorna Sports and IRTA to compete in the 2011 championship. A 38-rider provisional entry list was released on 24 January 2011. All Moto2 competitors raced with an identical CBR600RR inline-four engine developed by Honda. Teams competed with tyres supplied by Dunlop.

125cc participants
 A 32-rider provisional entry list was released on 24 January 2011.

All entries used Dunlop tyres.

Standings

MotoGP riders' standings
Scoring system
Points were awarded to the top fifteen finishers. Rider had to finish the race to earn points.

 Rounds marked with a light blue background were under wet race conditions or stopped by rain.
 Riders marked with light blue background were eligible for Rookie of the Year awards.

† – Marco Simoncelli was fatally injured during the Malaysian Grand Prix and the race was abandoned as a result.

Moto2 riders' standings
Scoring system
Points were awarded to the top fifteen finishers. Rider had to finish the race to earn points.

 Rounds marked with a light blue background were under wet race conditions or stopped by rain.
 Riders marked with light blue background were eligible for Rookie of the Year awards.

125cc riders' standings
Scoring system
Points were awarded to the top fifteen finishers. Rider had to finish the race to earn points.

 Rounds marked with a light blue background were under wet race conditions or stopped by rain.
 Riders marked with light blue background were eligible for Rookie of the Year awards.

Constructors' standings
Scoring system
Points were awarded to the top fifteen finishers. A rider had to finish the race to earn points.
 

 Each constructor gets the same number of points as their best placed rider in each race.
 Rounds marked with a light blue background were under wet race conditions or stopped by rain.

MotoGP

Moto2

125cc

Teams' standings
 Each team gets the total points scored by their two riders, including replacement riders. In one rider team, only the points scored by that rider will be counted. Wildcard riders do not score points.
 Rounds marked with a light blue background were under wet race conditions or stopped by rain.

MotoGP

† – Marco Simoncelli was fatally injured during the Malaysian Grand Prix and the race was abandoned as a result.

Footnotes

References

External links
 The official website of Grand Prix motorcycle racing

 
Grand Prix motorcycle racing seasons
Grand Prix motorcycle racing